Sérgio A. Lira, is a Brazilian-born American immunologist who pioneered the use of genetic approaches to study the function of chemokines. His early studies were the first to show that chemokines played a major role on leukocyte trafficking to the brain, the lung and the thymus.

Lira is currently the Leona M. and Harry B. Helmsley Charitable Trust Professor of Immunology at the Mount Sinai School of Medicine and previous co-director/director of the Immunology Institute at the Mount Sinai Medical Center (2007-2013 as co-director and 2013-2016 director), both in New York City. He is the author of more than 120 published articles.

Biography
Lira earned an M.D. from Universidade Federal de Pernambuco, in Recife, Brazil, in 1982 and a Ph.D. in physiology and pharmacology from the University of California, San Diego, in 1988. He completed a postdoctoral fellowship at the Department of Cell and Development Biology at the Roche Institute of Molecular Biology, New Jersey, in 1992. From 1992-1996, he was at Bristol-Myers-Squibb Pharmaceutical Research Institute as Head of the Transgenic Unit. He served as Director, Department of Immunology, at the Schering-Plough Research Institute between 1996-2002. He joined the Mount Sinai Medical Center in 2002 as the Irene Diamond Associate Professor of Immunology.

Lira organized the 2003 Keystone Symposium on Chemokines and the 2006 Gordon Research Conference on Chemotactic  Cytokines. He was elected to the Henry Kunkel Society in 2006 and to the Association of American Physicians in 2008. He received the Inventor’s Award (in 2000) and the Impact Award (in 1998) from the Schering-Plough Research Institute.

Areas of research
Lira’s lab pioneered the use of genetic approaches to study the function of chemokines during homeostasis and disease conditions. Other contributions  include studies on the mechanisms of lymphoid neogenesis and on the biological function of molecules encoded by viruses that mimic chemokines, including the discovery that the chemokine receptor encoded by herpesvirus 8 is an oncogene, a discovery that led to important insights into the mechanisms leading to the development of Kaposi’s sarcoma. Lira’s lab has also made important contributions to the study of IL-23, a cytokine that affects development of inflammatory and autoimmune conditions.

Honors and awards
Max Planck Gesellschaft (Germany) - Student Fellowship.  February 1980 - June  1980.
International Endocrine Society - Travel Award. International Congress of Endocrinology, Kyoto, Japan.  1988. 
President's Award - Bristol-Myers Squibb Company. 1995
Impact Award - Schering-Plough Research Institute. 1998
Inventor’s Award - Schering-Plough Research Institute. 2000
Irene Diamond Associate Professorship in Immunology Award – July 2002.
Elected to the Henry Kunkel Society – May 2006
Elected to the Association of American Physicians – April 2008

Publications
Partial list:

References

External links
The Mount Sinai Medical Center homepage
The Mount Sinai School of Medicine homepage
The Immunology Institute at the Mount Sinai Medical Center

Brazilian immunologists
Icahn School of Medicine at Mount Sinai faculty
University of California, San Diego alumni
Living people
Federal University of Pernambuco alumni
Year of birth missing (living people)